The 2020 Inner Mongolia protests was a protest caused by a curriculum reform imposed on ethnic schools by China's Inner Mongolia Department of Education. The two-part reform replaces Mongolian with Standard Mandarin as the medium of instruction in three particular subjects and replace three regional textbooks, printed in Mongolian script, by the  edited by the Ministry of Education, written in Standard Mandarin.

The three subjects in concern are Language and Literature (referring Standard Mandarin) from first grade, Morality and Rule of law  from first grade (a variant of civic education) and History from seventh grade. The reform was part of the national textbook reform rolled out elsewhere in China from Autumn 2017 to eliminate various provincial textbooks by the nationally unified textbook series, which has been criticized elsewhere in China.

The parents and students of the ethnic schools strongly opposed the curriculum reform. The sentiment spread to other Chinese Mongols not attending those schools, leading to protests. While seen as an attempt to assimilate ethnic minority, observers also note it exemplifies the "second generation's ethnic policy" under Chinese Communist Party (CCP) general secretary and President Xi Jinping, who "envisioned the melting pot formula, as the ultimate solution to the ethnic problems".

Background

Political history of Inner Mongolia

Inner Mongolia has, for a long time, experienced less violent ethnic strife than Xinjiang and Tibet. The region "was seen to have been largely pacified over many decades of Han migration, intermarriage and repression". Large-scale Han migration began from 1912 during the Beiyang government period when land became freely traded. By 1937, the aggregated figure of the census of the Nanking Nationalist government-ruled Suiyuan Province and Chahar Province and the census of Japanese-puppet Manchukuo and Mongol United Autonomous Government, reported 3,720,000 Hans and 860,000 Mongols (roughly 8:2 ratio) within modern Inner Mongolian boundary. That ratio continues today.

The 1981 Inner Mongolia student protest opposed a package of new policies which worsened steppe degradation and the political representation of Chinese Mongols. In May 2011, unrest erupted when a coal truck collided and killed a Chinese Mongol herdman, and was later followed with unrests which complained of the environmental impact of mining and unfair development policies.

Origin of protest: Curriculum reform, 2020
The top four languages native to Inner Mongolia are Jin language, Northeastern Mandarin, varieties of Mongolian dialects and Lanzhou-Ningxia Mandarin. The majority of Mongols and almost all Hans opt to send their children to schools taught in Standard Mandarin, in recognition of the economic opportunities that would reap. Yet, a sizable minority among the Mongols attend ethnic schools, taught primarily in Mongolian.

On 26 August 2020, Inner Mongolia's Department of Education officially published a two-part curriculum reform for ethnic schools. Mongolian as the medium of instruction will be replaced by Standard Mandarin in the three subjects of Language and Literature (referring Standard Mandarin) from first grade, Morality and Rule of law  from first grade (a variant of civic education) and History from seventh grade. This policy has been applied in every province including Tibet and Xinjiang, and is now making inroad into Inner Mongolia. This policy does not change the education of the Mongolian Language Art itself. 

While seen as an attempt to assimilate ethnic minority, observers also note it exemplifies the "second-generation's ethnic policy" under paramount leader Xi Jinping, who "envisioned the melting pot formula of the West, in particular the U.S.A., as the ultimate solution to the ethnic problems". Xi Jinping "rejects the old Soviet-based system, which allowed relative autonomy and preservation of language and culture in designated regions, in favor of the new approach". 

Using the nationally unified textbooks on those three affected subjects would also mean the application of standard exams, thus would have direct impacts on the student exam grades in important exams, such as The National College Entrance Exams. This could also be a factor causing some parents to protest.

Protests

Timeline
Sign of public defiance began on 30 August, when students in Inner Mongolia protesting against the new Mandarin Chinese language program. However, it remained local until 31 August 2020, when the Inner Mongolian education department announced that Mongolian language would be removed in history, politics, language and literature subjects, started from 1 September, and will become officially effects, with other subjects to be added.

Following the announcement, thousand of ethnic Mongols protested what they saw as an attempt to turn the Mongolian language into a foreign language in their homeland. The protesters considered this as an attempt by the Chinese government to curb them from learning the Mongolian language and to disconnect them from their nomadic background. Many Mongol families announced they would not send their children to schools until Mongolian language is reinstated as an education language in Inner Mongolia.

In a similar case in Tongliao, a prefecture of Inner Mongolia, parents found out about the announcement only after sending their kids to a boarding school, which led to the protests. The parents besieged the school before being repelled by the police. The authorities released their children from the school despite rampant pressure. Resentment against forced Mandarin-based education was also reflected on the Chinese social media by Mongol users, however it was removed by the authorities.

On 1 September, staff at a school in Naiman county told the BBC that only around 40 students had registered for the semester in place of the usual 1,000. Some subsequently changed their minds, and only some 10 remained. On the same time, 300,000 ethnic Mongol students went on strike against the policy imposed by Beijing. Even among those ethnic Mongols who support Chinese government, many Mongols objected the plan, with one Mongol, using short video app Kuaishou “I am Chinese, I am Mongolian, you can take anything from me except my mother language. Without language, I cannot say that I am Mongolian,” in a following demonstration against the policy.

On 2 September, several ethnic Mongols participated in the raising of khar suld (Black Banner in Mongolian). The khar suld has an implied connotation used only when Mongols fought against an enemy.

Reactions

China
Chinese state media like Xinhua News Agency and China Daily have largely ignored the protests and its demands at first, instead focusing on the planned festivals held in Inner Mongolia to social life of ethnic Mongols. However, at the same time, Chinese officials traveled to Inner Mongolia trying to persuade families to send their children back to schools, although there was a strong objection from Mongol families.

In early September, State Councilor and police minister Zhao Kezhi visited the region to strengthen the fight against “terrorism and separatism” during a tour to parts of the province. Chinese police of the region offering a 1,000 yuan bounty for anyone who could identify people participating in anti-government protests.

On the same time, Chinese police force has been deployed and increasing its activities across Inner Mongolia, with a number of people arrested for supporting the protests. Families that refused to send children to schools may be stripped of social benefits by the government.

On 4 September, a journalist for Los Angeles Times was allegedly detained for four hours before being expelled by the Chinese authorities for her coverage.

On 13 September, some counties' governments required guardians to send their children to school or they would be fined for up to 5000 yuan in response to student strike.

On 1 December, report said that the Chinese government is mass recruiting secondary school teachers to work in the northern region of Inner Mongolia. Online government documents issued in the weeks since protests rocked the region in early September reveal government plans to hire more than 1,000 teachers across the region.

Local banner and league governments across the region have also posted recruitment ads for hundreds of teachers from elsewhere in China to relocate to the region and teach Mandarin.

Taiwan
In Taipei, Former Council of Indigenous Peoples minister Yohani Isqaqavut, front, who is a Presbyterian pastor, and other members of the church's Indigenous Ministry Committee hold placards at a rally outside the Legislative Yuan in Taipei yesterday to express support for people in China's Inner Mongolia.

International
Many Mongols were outraged following the reports, although economic dependence on China largely undermines the opportunity to help. Dozens of Mongolian protesters marched to the Ministry of Foreign Affairs headquarter in Ulaanbaatar demanded reaction against ongoing repression of Mongol rights in China. The leader of the IMPP, Temtsiltu Shobtsood, who lives in exile in Germany, accused China of "trying to suppress" the Mongolian language.

In September 2020, the Congressional-Executive Commission on China issued a statement condemning the suppression of the protests and an assault on a U.S. journalist covering the protests. The same month, an international petition and movement by ethnic Mongols, “Save the Mongolian Language in Southern \Inner\ Mongolia,” was started.

On 24 and 25 November, hundreds of Mongolians living in Japan protested outside the National Assembly in Tokyo, calling on the Chinese Communist Party not to end Mongolian-medium education in Inner Mongolia. The protesters held up banners and placards in Mongolian, Chinese, Japanese and English such as "Withdraw the sinicization policy!" "Stop oppressing Mongolians!" and "Give Mongolians back their mother tongue!"

See also
1981 Inner Mongolia student protest on steppe degradation
Soviet-era Korenizatsiya
Melting pot
Ethnic issues in China
Ethnic groups in Chinese history
Mongols in China
Cultural assimilation of Native Americans

References

2020 in China
Protests in China
History of Inner Mongolia
Language policy in Inner Mongolia
Mongolian language
Xi Jinping
August 2020 events in China
September 2020 events in China
Indigenous rights protests
Ethnic conflict
Human rights of ethnic minorities in China
Linguistic discrimination
Anti-Mongolian sentiment